A program executive officer, or PEO, is one of a few key individuals in the United States military acquisition process.  As can be seen from the examples below, a program executive officer may be responsible for a specific program (e.g., the Joint Strike Fighter), or for an entire portfolio of similar programs (e.g., the Navy PEO for aircraft carriers).

Army: The direct reports of the Army Acquisition Executive are program executive officers for the respective program executive offices (PEOs)

The current program executive officers include (but may not be limited to):

Army
Each of the Army PEOs direct the Acquisition Executive's lines of effort,
 such as Ground combat systems. In 2016 Maj. Gen. Dave Bassett was PEO GCS The PEOs work closely with the directors of Cross-functional teams of the Army's Futures command.
Note: In 2018 MG Bassett became PEO C3T — (Program Executive Office Command Control Communications-Tactical) 
 Ammunition BG Vincent Malone, JPEO AMMO (renamed Joint PEO Armaments and Ammunition) Picatinny Arsenal
 Aviation BG Robert Barrie, PEO AVN Redstone Arsenal
 Chemical, Biological, Radiological and Nuclear Defense Darryl Colvin (Acting), JPEO-CBRND Aberdeen Proving Ground MD
 Combat Support & Combat Service Support Tim Goddette, PEO CS & CSS Detroit Arsenal (Warren, Michigan)
 Command Control and Communications (Tactical) MG Anthony Potts succeeds MG Robert M. Collins as PEO C3T Aberdeen Proving Ground MD
 Enterprise Information Systems Mr. Ross Guckert, PEO EIS Fort Belvoir
 Ground Combat Systems MG Brian Cummings, PEO GCS Detroit Arsenal (Warren, Michigan) 
 Intelligence, Electronic Warfare and Sensors Mr. Mark Kitz PEO IEW&S Aberdeen Proving Ground MD
 Missiles and Space BG Frank Lozano, PEO Missiles & Space Redstone Arsenal
 Rapid Capabilities (RCO) Tanya Skeen, PEO RCO (Skeen has now moved to DoD, late 2018). In 2019 RCO became the Rapid Capabilities and Critical Technologies Office (RCCTO) The Pentagon, headed by Lt. Gen. Robert Rasch, formerly L. Neil Thurgood
 Simulation, Training, and Instrumentation Ms. Karen Saunders, PEO STRI Orlando, FL
 Soldier MG Anthony Potts, PEO Soldier Fort Belvoir
 Program Executive Office, Assembled Chemical Weapons Alternatives Michael Abaie, PEO ACWA  Aberdeen Proving Ground MD

Navy
 Joint Strike Fighter
 Air ASW, Assault, and Special Mission Programs
 Aircraft carriers
 C4I
 Space
 Enterprise Information Systems
 Integrated Warfare
 Unmanned and Small Combatants (formerly Littoral and Mine Warfare)
 Ships
 Space Systems
 Strike Weapons and Unmanned Aviation
 Submarines
 Tactical Air Programs
 Land Systems (USMC)

Air Force
 Aircraft Aeronautical Systems Center
 Agile Combat Systems (ACS)77th Aeronautical Systems Wing
 Intelligence, Surveillance, and Reconnaissance / Special Operation Forces (ISR/SOF)
 Fighter / Bombers (FB)312th Aeronautical Systems Wing
 Mobility 516th Aeronautical Systems Wing
 KC-46A
 Command, Control, Communication, Infrastructure & Networks (C3I&N) Air Force Life Cycle Management Center
 Enterprise Logistics Systems
 Command and Control / Intelligence, Surveillance, and Reconnaissance (C2ISR)
 Cyber NetCentric
 Digital Air Force Life Cycle Management Center
 Enterprise Information Systems
 Nuclear Command and Control (NCC)
 Strategic Systems
 Weapons
 Services* Rapid Capability
 Joint Strike Fighter (JSF)

Space Force
 Assured Access to Space (AATS): Maj Gen Stephen G. Purdy
 Battle Management Command, Control, and Communications (BMC3): Brig Gen Timothy Sejba
 Space Domain Awareness & Combat Power (SZ): Brig Gen Timothy Sejba
 Military Communications & Positioning, Navigation, and Timing (MilComm & PNT): Cordell A. Delapena Jr.
 Space Sensing: Col Brian A. Denaro
 Space Development Agency (SDA): Derek Tournear
 Space Rapid Capabilities Office (SpRCO): Kelly D. Hammett

Military
 Health Systems

References

American military personnel
Military ranks of the United States